The 1998–99 Division 1 season was the 24th and last season that Division 1 operated as the second tier of ice hockey in Sweden, below the top-flight Elitserien (now the SHL). The Allsvenskan was founded as the new second-level league for the 1999-2000 season. Division 1 became the new third-level league for the following season.

Format 
Division 1 was divided into four starting groups of eight teams each. The top two teams in each group qualified for the Allsvenskan, while the remaining six teams had to compete in a qualifying round. The teams were given zero to five bonus points based on their finish in the first round. The top two teams in each qualifying round qualified for the playoffs. The four worst teams in each qualifying group had to play in a relegation round in an attempt to qualify for the new Allsvenskan for the following season.

Of the eight teams in the Allsvenskan, the top two qualified directly for the Kvalserien. The third-sixth place teams qualified for the second round of the playoffs. The two playoff winners qualified for the Kvalserien, in which the top two teams qualified for the following Elitserien season.

Regular season

Northern Group

First round

Qualification round

Western Group

First round

Qualification round

Eastern Group

First round

Qualification round

Southern Group

First round

Qualification round

Promotion round

Allsvenskan

Playoffs

First round 
 IFK Kumla - Bofors IK 2:1 (6:2, 3:4, 4:2)
 Hammarby IF - Arlanda HC 2:0 (7:1, 4:2)
 Skellefteå AIK - Piteå HC 2:0 (5:3, 6:4)
 Tranås AIF - Rögle BK 1:2 (2:3 OT., 4:3, 2:6)

Second round 
 IFK Kumla - Timrå IK 0:2 (1:8, 4:6)
 Hammarby IF - IF Sundsvall 1:2 (1:3, 2:1 SO, 4:7)
 Rögle BK - Mora IK 0:2 (4:6, 4:6)
 Skellefteå AIK - IF Troja-Ljungby 1:2 (2:1 OT, 1:3, 4:5 OT)

Third round 
 Timrå IK - Mora IK 0:2 (2:4, 1:3)
 IF Sundsvall - IF Troja-Ljungby 0:2 (0:1, 1:2 OT)

Kvalserien

Relegation round

Northern Group

Western Group

Eastern Group

Southern Group

External links 
Season on hockeyarchives.info

Swedish Division I seasons
Swed
2